Kaleidoscope is an album by saxophonist Sonny Stitt compiling tracks recorded in 1950-52 and released on the Prestige label in 1957. The 1991 CD reissue added four bonus tracks to the original LP.

Reception
The Allmusic review stated "Deftly handling the alto, tenor, and baritone saxophone, bebop giant Sonny Stitt is heard to perfection here on a variety of early-'50s dates. Stitt not only shows off his patented speed throughout, but he goes a long way in dispelling criticisms of him being all fire and no grace".

Track listing 
All compositions by Sonny Stitt and Bill Massey except as indicated
 "Stitt's It" - 2:35     
 "Cool Mambo" - 2:40     
 "Blue Mambo" - 2:25     
 "Sonny Sounds" - 2:29     
 "Ain't Misbehavin'" (Harry Brooks, Andy Razaf, Fats Waller) -  3:02     
 "Later" (Sonny Stitt) - 3:00     
 "P.S. I Love You" (Gordon Jenkins, Johnny Mercer) - 3:00     
 "This Can't Be Love" (Lorenz Hart, Richard Rodgers) - 2:47     
 "Imagination" (Johnny Burke, Jimmy Van Heusen) - 3:24     
 "Cherokee" (Ray Noble) - 2:33     
 "Can't We Be Friends" (Paul James, Kay Swift) - 2:41     
 "Liza (All the Clouds'll Roll Away)" (George Gershwin, Ira Gershwin, Gus Kahn) - 2:45     
 "To Think You've Chosen Me" (Bennie Benjamin, George David Weiss) - 3:11 Bonus track on CD reissue     
 "After You've Gone" (Henry Creamer, Turner Layton) - 2:25 Bonus track on CD reissue     
 "Our Very Own" (Jack Elliott, Victor Young) - 3:05 Bonus track on CD reissue     
 "'S Wonderful" (George Gershwin, Ira Gershwin) - 2:24 Bonus track on CD reissue  
Recorded in New York City on February 17, 1950 (tracks 5 & 6), October 8, 1950 (tracks 13-16), December 15, 1950 (tracks 9 & 10), January 31, 1951 (tracks 11 & 12), February 1, 1951 (tracks 7 & 8) and February 25, 1952 (tracks 1-4)

Personnel 
Sonny Stitt - tenor saxophone (tracks 1-6 & 13-16), baritone saxophone (tracks 7-8), alto saxophone (tracks 9-12)
John Hunt (tracks 1-4), Bill Massey (tracks 1-4 & 13-16), Joe Newman (tracks 1-4) - trumpet
Matthew Gee - trombone (tracks 13-16)
Gene Ammons - baritone saxophone (tracks 13-16)
Charlie Bateman (tracks 7, 8, 11 & 12), Kenny Drew (tracks 5 & 6), John Houston (tracks 1-4), Junior Mance (tracks 9-16) - piano
Tommy Potter (tracks 5 & 6), Ernie Shepherd (tracks 1-4), Gene Wright (tracks 7-16) - bass
Art Blakey (tracks 5, 6, 9 & 10), Wes Landers (tracks 13-16), Teddy Stewart (tracks 7, 8, 11 & 12), Shadow Wilson (tracks 1-4) - drums
Humberto Molares - congas (tracks 1-4)
Larry Townsend - vocals (tracks 13-16)

References 

1957 compilation albums
Prestige Records compilation albums
Sonny Stitt compilation albums
Albums produced by Bob Weinstock